Athelstane "Athol" Milne (10 December 1889 – 19 September 1946) was an Australian rules footballer who played for the University Football Club in the Victorian Football League (VFL).

He later served in World War I.

Sources

External links

1889 births
1946 deaths
Australian rules footballers from Melbourne
University Football Club players
Australian military personnel of World War I
People from Hawthorn, Victoria
Military personnel from Melbourne